Waterton is an unincorporated community in Huntington Township, Luzerne County, Pennsylvania, United States.  It lies between the boroughs of New Columbus and Shickshinny.

Unincorporated communities in Luzerne County, Pennsylvania
Unincorporated communities in Pennsylvania